Quakertown is a borough in Bucks County, Pennsylvania, United States. As of 2020, it had a population of 9,359.

Quakertown is considered part of the United States Census Bureau's Philadelphia−Camden−Wilmington (PA−NJ−DE-MD) MSA and the Delaware Valley. Quakertown is surrounded by Richland Township.

History

Quaker settlement
Quakertown was originally settled by members of the Religious Society of Friends, or Quakers. The settlement was not officially known as Quakertown until its first post office opened in 1803.

Liberty Bell moved
On September 18, 1777, during the American Revolutionary War, a convoy of wagons carrying the Liberty Bell from Philadelphia to Allentown, under the command of Col. Thomas Polk of Charlotte, North Carolina, stopped in Quakertown. The Liberty Bell was stored overnight behind the home of Evan Foulke (1237 West Broad Street), and the entourage stayed at the Red Lion Inn. The John Fries' Rebellion was also started in the Red Lion Inn in 1799.

1800s growth
In 1854, Quakertown elected its first Burgess. The North Pennsylvania Railroad facilitated access to the area, which brought about a great increase in population, and by 1880, the population of Quakertown had almost reached 1,800.

Liberty Hall, Quakertown Historic District, Quakertown Passenger and Freight Station, and Enoch Roberts House are listed on the National Register of Historic Places.

Industry and population
The Civil War, along with national economic expansion, changed Quakertown from a tiny village to a commercial manufacturing center.  In the nineteenth century, local industrial establishments included cigar and cigar box factories, silk mills, harness factories, and stove foundries. Until 1969, Quakertown generated its own electrical power. As of 2022, Quakertown has extensive mall development along Pennsylvania Route 309 that includes many restaurants, businesses, and retail outlets. The population of Quakertown in 1900 was 3,014; it rose to 3,801 in 1910. By 1940, the population had reached 5,150 people. At the 2010 census, the borough's population was 8,979.

Interurban to Allentown and Philadelphia
From 1901 to 1951, Quakertown was an hourly stop on the Lehigh Valley Transit Company's electric interurban trolley line from Allentown and Coopersburg through Quakertown then south through Perkasie, Sellersville, Souderton, Lansdale, and Norristown to Philadelphia. With car use limited during World War II due to gasoline rationing, the trolley line moved a very large number of passengers. After the war, as was the case with many other railways, its business collapsed, and it ceased operation in 1951. The LVT station at the northwestern corner of Main and Broad streets, across from the Red Lion Inn, still stands and is marked on one wall for that history. It ran in the center of Main Street as it progressed southbound to Perkasie.

Geography
Licking Run begins in passes through Quakertown from the west to the east and drains into the Tohickon Creek. Tohickon Creek, which drains into the Delaware River, flows past the northeastern edge of the borough.

Climate
According to the Köppen climate classification system, Quakertown has a Hot-summer, Humid continental climate (Dfa). Dfa climates are characterized by at least one month having an average mean temperature ≤ , at least four months with an average mean temperature ≥ , at least one month with an average mean temperature ≥  and no significant precipitation difference between seasons. Although most summer days are slightly humid in Quakertown, episodes of heat and high humidity can occur with heat index values > . The average wettest month is July which corresponds with the annual peak in thunderstorm activity. Episodes of extreme cold and wind can occur with wind chill values < . Ice storms and large snowstorms depositing ≥  of snow occur once every few years, particularly during nor’easters from December through February.

Ecology
According to the A. W. Kuchler U.S. potential natural vegetation types, Quakertown has a dominant vegetation type of Appalachian Oak (104) with a dominant vegetation form of Eastern Hardwood Forest (25). The spring bloom typically begins by April 12 and fall color usually peaks by October 28.

Demographics

As of the census of 2020, there were 9,359 people living in the borough.  The racial makeup of the borough was 88.3% White, 5.3% African American, 2.0% Asian, 2.7% from other races, 0% pacific islander, 0% American Indian or Alaska Native, and 2.9% from two or more races. Hispanic or Latino of any race were 5.4% of the population.

As of the census of 2000, there were 8,931 people, 3,421 households, and 2,251 families living in the borough. The population density was 4,424.7 people per square mile (1,707.1/km²). There were 3,631 housing units at an average density of 1,798.9 per square mile (694.0/km²). The racial makeup of the borough was 94.46% White, 1.20% African American, 0.13% Native American, 1.51% Asian, 0.06% Pacific Islander, 1.58% from other races, and 1.06% from two or more races. Hispanic or Latino of any race were 2.88% of the population.

There were 3,421 households, out of which 32.9% had children under the age of 18 living with them, 50.7% were married couples living together, 10.5% had a female householder with no husband present, and 34.2% were non-families. 28.3% of all households were made up of individuals, and 11.9% had someone living alone who was 65 years of age or older. The average household size was 2.52 and the average family size was 3.11.

In the borough, the population was spread out, with 25.5% under the age of 18, 7.9% from 18 to 24, 32.2% from 25 to 44, 19.1% from 45 to 64, and 15.3% who were 65 years of age or older. The median age was 36 years. For every 100 females there were 95.9 males. For every 100 females age 18 and over, there were 92.1 males.

The median income for a household in the borough was $41,942, and the median income for a family was $51,194. Males had a median income of $33,697 versus $26,988 for females. The per capita income for the borough was $20,562. About 3.7% of families and 5.9% of the population were below the poverty line, including 7.0% of those under age 18 and 6.7% of those age 65 or over.

Government
Quakertown has a council-manager system of government. The borough has a seven-member Borough Council elected at-large to four-year terms. The council appoints a Borough Manager who manages the daily operations of the borough. As of 2017, the members of Borough Council are President James Shapley, Vice President Donald E. Rosenberger, Jon Roth, Michael Johnson, Douglas Propst, Lisa J. Gaier, Esq., and Jann Paulovitz.

Legislators
State Representative Craig Staats, Republican, Pennsylvania House of Representatives, District 145
State Senator Jarrett Coleman, Republican, Pennsylvania Senate, District 16
US Representative Brian Fitzpatrick, Republican, Pennsylvania's 1st congressional district

Infrastructure

Transportation

Quakertown is directly served by four state highways. PA 309 passes through the western part of Quakertown as West End Boulevard and runs north to Allentown and south to Montgomeryville and Philadelphia. PA 313 begins at PA 309 in Quakertown and passes through the town on Broad Street, heading southeast to Doylestown. PA 663 heads west from Quakertown at the PA 309/PA 313 intersection and interchanges with I-476 (Pennsylvania Turnpike Northeast Extension) at the Quakertown interchange in Milford Township before heading southwest to Pottstown. PA 212 heads northeast from PA 313 in Quakertown and provides access to Riegelsville.

Quakertown has intercity bus service provided by multiple carriers. Trans-Bridge Lines provides service from a stop on Broad Street in downtown to Doylestown and the Port Authority Bus Terminal in New York City. Fullington Trailways provides service from a park and ride lot on PA 663 in Milford Township to the Philadelphia Greyhound Terminal, Hazleton, Williamsport, and several other places in northern Pennsylvania. Martz Trailways provides service from the park and ride lot on PA 663 to Scranton, Wilkes-Barre, White Haven, Allentown, and Philadelphia. This is an Amtrak Thruway route, connecting to Amtrak trains at 30th Street Station in Philadelphia.

Quakertown had passenger rail service from the Quakertown station along the Bethlehem Line to Bethlehem and Philadelphia until July 27, 1981, when SEPTA ended service on all its intercity diesel-powered lines. Due to the numerous industrial complexes in Quakertown, the borough currently has freight rail service provided by a branch of the East Penn Railroad along the former SEPTA tracks.

Quakertown has a public general aviation airport, simply named Quakertown Airport. The airport is not located in the Quakertown borough itself, but in neighboring Milford Township.

Utilities
Quakertown provides various utility services to businesses and residents. The Borough of Quakertown Electric Department provides electricity to the borough. The borough has operated its own electric department since the early 1890s and generated its own electricity until 1969, with electricity now purchased wholesale. The Borough of Quakertown Water Department provides water to the borough, operating ten wells and three storage facilities. The Borough of Quakertown Sewer Department provides sewer service to the borough, operating a wastewater treatment plant. Natural gas service in Quakertown is provided by UGI Utilities. The Borough of Quakertown Sanitation Department provides trash and recycling collection.

Health care
St. Luke's University Health Network operates St. Luke's Upper Bucks Campus hospital outside the borough in Milford Township, serving the northern portion of Bucks County. The hospital was opened as Quakertown Community Hospital, located within the borough of Quakertown, on June 5, 1930, and was acquired by St. Luke's University Health Network in August 1995. St. Luke's Quakertown Campus was replaced by St. Luke's Upper Bucks Campus on December 14, 2019. St. Luke's Upper Bucks Campus offers an emergency room and various inpatient and outpatient services including women's health services, surgical services, heart and vascular services, radiology services, and wound care. Grand View Health and Lehigh Valley Health Network jointly operate the Health Center at Quakertown, which offers various outpatient services such as laboratory services, X-rays, and cardiac testing along with physician offices focusing on cardiology, orthopedics, primary care, specialty care, and pediatrics.

Police and fire

Police services in the borough are provided 24 hours a day, 7 days a week by the Quakertown Borough Police Department, which consists of a Chief, Detective Lieutenant, Administrative Sergeant, two Patrol Sergeants, two Detectives, twelve Patrol Officers, and three support staff. Fire protection in Quakertown and surrounding areas is provided by the Quakertown Fire Department, a volunteer fire department which operates the Quakertown Fire Company #1-Station 17 on West Broad Street and the West End Fire Company-Station 18 on Park Avenue.

Education
Quakertown Community School District serves public school students in the borough. Quakertown Elementary School, a historic school, and Neidig Elementary School, both located within borough limits, serve students in grades K-5 based on where they live. The Sixth Grade Center serves borough students in sixth grade, Strayer Middle School serves grades 7-8, and Quakertown Community High School serves grades 9-12.

The Archdiocese of Philadelphia operates St. Isidore school, located within borough limits, for many parochial school students. The borough is also home to the United Friends School.

Notable people
Megan Angelo, journalist and author
Diane Bracalente, U.S. 1988 Summer Olympic field hockey player
Sabrina Carpenter, singer and actress
Katlyn Chookagian, UFC Fighter
Tim Lewis, former professional football player for the Green Bay Packers
Bill Mensch, microcomputer pioneer
Louis Riddick, former professional football player for the San Francisco 49ers and Monday Night Football analyst
Ken Schroy, former professional football player for the New York Jets
Jan Shepard, film and television actress
Hampton S. Thomas, Medal of Honor recipient in the American Civil War.
Neil Vipond, Canadian-American actor

References

External links

Quakertown official website

1700 establishments in Pennsylvania
Boroughs in Bucks County, Pennsylvania
Populated places established in 1700